Eutane triplagata is a moth of the subfamily Arctiinae first described by Pagenstecher in 1900. It is found in Papua New Guinea.

References

Moths described in 1900
Lithosiini